Hugh Hewitt (born February 22, 1956) is an American radio talk show host with the Salem Radio Network and an attorney, academic, and author. A conservative, he writes about law, society, politics, and media bias in the United States. Hewitt is a former official in the Reagan Administration, the former president and CEO of the Richard Nixon Foundation, a law professor at Chapman University School of Law, a columnist for The Washington Post and a regular political commentator on Fox News Channel.

Early life 
Hewitt was born on February 22, 1956, in Warren, Ohio. He is the son of Marguerite (née Rohl) and William Robert Hewitt. He describes himself as "a descendant of both Ulster and the Republic through a green-orange marriage of immigrants from County Down and County Clare". He attended John F. Kennedy Catholic High School in Warren, Ohio. He then graduated cum laude from Harvard University with a B.A. in government in 1978. After leaving Harvard, he worked as a ghostwriter for Richard Nixon in California and New York, before studying at the University of Michigan Law School, where he was inducted into the Order of the Coif. Hewitt received his J.D. degree in 1983, then moved to Washington D.C. to clerk for Judges Roger Robb and George MacKinnon on the U.S. Court of Appeals for the District of Columbia Circuit in 1983–84.

Career
Hewitt worked in many posts in the Ronald Reagan administration, including deputy director and General Counsel of the Office of Personnel Management, General Counsel for the National Endowment for the Humanities, Assistant White House Counsel, and Special Assistant to the Attorney General.

In 1989, Hewitt became the executive director of the Richard Nixon Presidential Library and Museum. In 1990, he sparked controversy by proposing screening of researchers wishing to use the library resources. Hewitt suggested refusing admission to researchers deemed "unfriendly" – specifically Bob Woodward, whom he characterized as "not a responsible journalist." John Taylor, a spokesman for Nixon, overturned Hewitt's decision after two days. It became the subject of editorial rebuke in The New York Times.

Hewitt left the Nixon Library in 1990. He hosted a weekend radio talk show for the Los Angeles radio station KFI, where he broadcast until 1995. In the spring of 1992, he began co-hosting L.A. PBS member station KCET's program Life & Times, and remained with the program until the fall of 2001, when he began broadcasting his own radio show. Hewitt received three Emmys for his work on Life & Times on KCET, and also conceived and hosted the 1996 PBS series Searching for God in America.

He has worked as a weekly columnist for the Daily Standard (the online edition of The Weekly Standard) and World. He has appeared on programs such as The Dennis Miller Show, Hardball with Chris Matthews, Larry King Live, The O'Reilly Factor, The Today Show and The Colbert Report.

Hewitt also became a Professor of Law at Chapman University School of Law. Hewitt founded the journal Nexus Journal of Law and Policy.

In 2019, Hewitt returned to the Nixon Library as president and CEO of the Richard Nixon Foundation, the nonprofit that co-operates the Nixon Library with the National Archives and Records Administration. On his first day in the job, Hewitt announced that he would split his time between Orange County and Washington, D.C. and open a Nixon Foundation office in Washington. In November 2021, Hewitt was replaced as President and CEO by Jim Byron.

In March 2020, after Joe Biden won the South Carolina presidential primary, Hewitt predicted that Biden's victory would be of little benefit to his campaign and that Bernie Sanders would perform strongly on Super Tuesday; after Biden took the lead on Super Tuesday and eventually won the Democratic nomination, Politico named Hewitt's predictions among "the most audacious, confident and spectacularly incorrect prognostications about the year".

The Hugh Hewitt Show (radio) 
Hewitt's nationally syndicated radio show, The Hugh Hewitt Show, is broadcast from California from 6 to 9 am ET on weekdays. The show appears on more than 75 stations and is syndicated by the Salem Radio Network. Beginning April 4, 2016, the show moved to a morning drive time slot. Although Hewitt's background is in law, government, and politics, he also covers American cultural trends and the entertainment industry. He frequently critiques the mainstream media on air, often inviting journalists to defend their work on the show. His regular contributors include law professors John C. Eastman, former Dean of Chapman University School of Law, and Erwin Chemerinsky, erstwhile Dean of UC Irvine Law School and current Dean of UC Berkeley School of Law (whom Hewitt calls "The Smart Guys"), James Lileks, Mark Steyn, United States Naval Academy English professor David Allen White (who does a monthly Shakespeare showcase), and Congressman David Dreier (R-CA), as well as frequent callers from around the country. He used to spend the 15th hour of the week discussing movies with "Emmett of the Unblinking Eye".

Hugh Hewitt (television) 

On June 24, 2017, Hugh Hewitt debuted, a half-hour television show which ran on MSNBC in the Saturdays 8 a.m. EST timeslot. On the show, he conducted interviews and provided commentary on current events. On Saturday, June 30, 2018, Hewitt announced that the show had been cancelled, but that he would continue his commentary on the NBC family of networks. In 2020, NBC and MSNBC stopped inviting Hewitt to appear on their programs, which constituted a breach of contract. Thus, in 2021, Hewitt was released from that contract and started appearing on Fox News Channel.

Salem News Channel 
Hugh Hewitt also broadcasts on the Salem Radio Network. His show began streaming on the Salem News Channel in November 2021.

Political views 
Hewitt has described George Will and Charles Krauthammer as models for his style of punditry. Politico described Hewitt as an "ardent Reaganite".

Foreign policy 
In a 2006 interview on CNN with Anderson Cooper, Hewitt said that in regards to George W. Bush's decisions while President, the War in Iraq would go down as "one of the wisest he has made." In regard to the Syrian Civil War, Hewitt stated that President Donald Trump was making a "major error" in deciding to draw down the number of U.S. troops in the country, over seven years after the beginning of the conflict. Hewitt has advocated for increasing the defense budget in the United States, stating that "any Republicans who vote against higher defense spending should be fired."

Donald Trump 
Hewitt moderated several of the 2016 Republican Party presidential debates and forums, where he clashed with Donald Trump. Hewitt said that Trump did not possess "the temperament to be president". In February 2016, Hewitt wrote that, despite being repeatedly publicly insulted by Trump, he would support him should he become the Republican nominee for president. In June 2016, after Trump's controversial remarks concerning Judge Gonzalo Curiel, Hewitt publicly called on the RNC to disendorse Trump as nominee. A week later, Hewitt reversed his position in a Washington Post op-ed. Internal emails showed that a Salem Media executive pressured Hewitt to support Trump, and that the Salem Media executive attributed Hewitt's support for Trump in the aforementioned Washington Post op-ed shortly after to the pressure. Hewitt denied being pressured to change his position on Trump.

On August 3, he publicly floated the idea of replacing Donald with Ivanka Trump on the ticket. On October 8, he called on Trump to drop out of the race after the Access Hollywood tape emerged. Hewitt has said he ultimately voted for Trump.

Hewitt supported Trump's decision to re-shuffle his foreign policy staff in March–April 2018, and place John Bolton and Mike Pompeo in key national security positions. He described John Bolton, a zionist hawk, as "peace-through-strength, 600-ship [navy], Reagan conservative" (as compared to Trump's approach, which Hewitt likened to the Great White Fleet). According to Politico, Hewitt emerged "perhaps the most public advocate for Trump’s hawkish new national security team at a time when others, even inside his own party, have voiced increasing fears that Trump is surrounding himself with war-minded hawks who may play to the president’s worst instincts."

Amid the Trump-Ukraine scandal, which led to the first impeachment of Donald Trump, Hewitt floated a conspiracy theory that the whistleblower complaint that set off the scandal was by a whistleblower who was trying to divert attention from his own involvement in a "Clintons-Obama-Biden collusion debacle". He penned an op-ed about the impeachment inquiry titled, "Impeachment-minded Democrats, welcome to Al Capone’s vault. Look familiar?" He said that the FBI had tried a "coup" against Trump and that Democrats were trying "another coup". He described the July 25 phone call in which Trump requested that Ukrainian President Volodymyr Zelenskyy investigate Joe Biden, a 2020 Democratic presidential candidate, as a "nothingburger."

In October 2019, Hewitt defended Trump's decision to remove a small contingent of US military forces from Northern Syria where they served as a buffer between Turkey and Syrian Kurds, leaving Kurds vulnerable to attack by Turkish forces.

Immigration 
In a June 2018 interview with then Attorney General Jeff Sessions, Hewitt repeatedly pressed Sessions about the morality of the Trump administration's decision to separate undocumented immigrant children from their parents. Hewitt said, "I don’t think children should be separated from biological parents at any age, but especially if they’re infants and toddlers. I think it’s traumatic and terribly difficult on the child."

Controversy and potential lawsuit

Scott Pruitt 
In April 2018, Hewitt defended EPA Administrator Scott Pruitt amid controversy over his expenditures as Administrator and a conflict of interest over renting a condo at discounted prices from a lobbyist representing clients regulated by the EPA. Politico described Hewitt as "one of Pruitt's staunchest defenders". Hewitt described the numerous ethics scandals facing Pruitt as "nonsense scandals" and argued that Pruitt's critics were "just trying to stop the deregulation effort". Hewitt argued that the top EPA ethics official had approved Pruitt's rental arrangement and that it therefore did not constitute a gift. Richard Painter, ethics lawyer in the George W. Bush administration, argued against Hewitt, saying it was a "violation of the gift rules, and no ethics lawyer could cover that up".

Hewitt has argued that media coverage of Pruitt has been "hyperpartisan". In an interview with Pruitt, Hewitt said "I know you are not a climate denier"; Pruitt rejects the scientific consensus on climate change. After Pruitt resigned amid a dozen separate ethics investigations, Hewitt defended Pruitt, saying he "is a good friend and a very good man, caricatured by left and MSM. I hope he sets to work on a memoir ASAP and deals out a tenth of what he took."

The conflict of interest is that Hugh Hewitt's son, James, is a political appointee working under Pruitt. In May 2018, it was reported that Pruitt had personally prioritized a polluted Orange County site for immediate and intense clean-up via long-term federal clean-up funding after Hewitt had brokered a December 2017 meeting between Pruitt and a legal firm representing the polluted district. The EPA did not disclose the meeting; it was revealed after a Freedom of Information Act lawsuit. Hewitt lived in Orange County for over two decades before relocating to Virginia in 2015; he is employed by the law firm. After the meeting, Hewitt would frequently defend Pruitt amid a number of ethics scandals. Fred Hiatt, the editorial page editor at The Washington Post, where Hewitt is a contributing columnist, said that he was "disturbed" by the reports of Hewitt's undisclosed ties, and that Hewitt would not write on issues related to the EPA again. MSNBC gave Hewitt a verbal warning after he failed to disclose the EPA meeting to viewers of his MSNBC show.

CNN Debate
Hewitt was booed during a CNN debate in 2015 for his controversial questioning of presidential candidate Ben Carson. He asked whether Carson was capable of ordering "ruthless" military strikes that could kill thousands of innocent children. Following Carson's initial answer to the question, Hewitt asked Carson to confirm whether he was, in fact, "OK with the death of thousands of innocent children and civilians." The audience subsequently booed Hewitt.

Books 
  The Queen: The Epic Ambition of Hillary and the Coming of a Second "Clinton Era" (2015)
 The Happiest Life: Seven Gifts, Seven Givers, and the Secret to Genuine Success (2013)
 The Brief Against Obama: The Rise, Fall & Epic Fail of the Hope & Change Presidency (2012)
 The War Against the West: Crucial Conversations with the Most Informed Experts About Our Enemies, Our Defenses, Our Strategy and Our Leaders in the Long War Against Islamist Extremism (2008)
 A Mormon in the White House?: 10 Things Every American Should Know about Mitt Romney (2007)
 A Guide to Christian Ambition: Using Career, Politics, and Culture to Influence the World (2006)
 Painting the Map Red: The Fight to Create a Permanent Republican Majority (2006)
 Blog: Understanding the Information Reformation That's Changing Your World (2005)
 If It's Not Close, They Can't Cheat: Crushing the Democrats in Every Election and Why Your Life Depends on It (2004)
 In, But Not Of: A Guide to Christian Ambition (2003)
 The Embarrassed Believer (1998)
 Searching for God in America: The Companion Volume to the Acclaimed TV Series (1996)
 First Principles: A Primer of Ideas for the College-Bound Student (1987)

References

External links

 
 Hewitt's columns at Townhall.com
 

1956 births
Living people
American alternative journalists
American male bloggers
American bloggers
American political commentators
American conservative talk radio hosts
American television journalists
Chapman University School of Law faculty
Harvard University alumni
People from Irvine, California
People from Warren, Ohio
University of Michigan Law School alumni
California Republicans
20th-century American non-fiction writers
21st-century American non-fiction writers
Journalists from California
Journalists from Ohio
MSNBC people